Carole Jane (Yarmila) Pachl, (born 23 December 1938) is a Canadian former figure skater.
She is the 1957 North American silver medallist and a three-time Canadian national champion. She competed at the 1956 Winter Olympics.

Personal life 
Carole Jane (Yarmila) Pachl was born in Prague, Czechoslovakia. Her mother, Jarmila née Pošíková, was an actress, while her father, Jan Pachl, was a wealthy chocolate manufacturer. Her brother, Rudy, was born a year later. By this time, Nazi Germany had begun its occupation of Czechoslovakia and World War II ensued. Her father, having opposed the Nazis, was imprisoned in a concentration camp and then, following the war, had most of his assets seized by the Communists.

Pachl and her mother resided for some time in England and St. Moritz, Switzerland, before the whole family moved to Montreal, Quebec, Canada. After becoming a naturalized Canadian citizen at age ten, four years ahead of the rest of her family, she moved to Lake Placid, New York, where she lived with an American family.

Career 
Pachl enjoyed watching figure skating and began practicing seriously at the age of eight after her mother brought her before Swiss coach Arnold Gerschwiler in England. In early 1947, she relocated to St. Moritz, Switzerland, where Gerschwiler continued coaching her.

After her family moved to Canada, Pachl trained in Montreal. Her club's president sponsored her early Canadian citizenship so that she could be sent to Lake Placid, New York to train under Gus Lussi when she was ten years old. She originally competed as Yarmila Pachl.

Pachl represented Montreal WC until 1952–53 and then joined the Minto Skating Club in Ottawa. She was coached by Otto Gold in Ottawa from around 1952. In 1953, she became the Canadian national bronze medallist on both the junior and senior levels. She finished sixth at the 1953 North American Championships in Cleveland and eighth at the 1954 World Championships in Oslo, Norway.

In 1955, Pachl won her first national title and went on to place fourth at the North American Championships and sixth at the World Championships in Vienna. She repeated as the national champion the following season and was named in Canada's team to the 1956 Winter Olympics in Cortina d'Ampezzo, Italy, where she placed sixth.

In 1957, her final competitive season, Pachl won her third national title and silver at the North American Championships. She finished fourth at the 1957 World Championships in Colorado Springs, Colorado.

Results

References

1938 births
Canadian female single skaters
Figure skaters at the 1956 Winter Olympics
Olympic figure skaters of Canada
Living people
Czechoslovak emigrants to Canada
Naturalized citizens of Canada